The Olten–Lucerne railway line is one of the major railway lines of Switzerland, running between Olten and Lucerne. It was built by the Schweizerische Centralbahn and opened to Lucerne in 1856. The Schweizerische Centralbahn was taken over by the Swiss Federal Railways in 1902.

Passenger services consist of a mixture of intercity, inter-regional and regional express services between Basel and Lucerne, some to or from Chiasso. There are also half-hour S-Bahn services between Lucern and Sursee (S18) and hourly services between Sursee and Olten (S22).

Notes

References

Railway lines in Switzerland